Polish Haitians ( or La Pologne) are Haitian people of Polish  ancestry dating to the early 19th century; a few may be Poles of more recent native birth who have gained Haitian citizenship. Cazale, a small village in the hills about 45 miles away from Port-au-Prince, is considered the main center of population of the ethnic Polish community in Haiti, but there are other villages as well. Cazale has descendants of surviving members of Napoleon's Polish Legionnaires which were forced into combat by Napoleon but later joined the Haitian slaves during the Haitian Revolution. Some 400 to 500 of these Poles are believed to have settled in Haiti after the war. They were given special status as Noir (legally considered to be black, not white despite actual race) by Jean-Jacques Dessalines, governor-general and emperor, and full citizenship under the Haitian constitution.

History
In 1802, Napoleon dispatched a Polish legion of around 5,200 men to join the French forces in Saint-Domingue to suppress the Haitian slave rebellion. The Poles may have been hoping to receive French support in restoring Poland's independence from its partitioners and oppressors – Prussia (later Germany), Russia, and Austria – who divided the country in the late 18th century. Some were told that there was a revolt of prisoners in Saint-Domingue. After they arrived and began to be thrown into battle, the Polish platoon learned that the French were trying to suppress an uprising by enslaved Africans fighting for their freedom from white masters.

Both French and Polish soldiers had high mortality, with more dying because of yellow fever than being killed in warfare. Surviving Polish soldiers admired their opponents, and eventually turned on the French army and joined the rebelling Haitians. Those of the Polish soldiers who remained alongside the French, intentionally did not follow the orders properly and refused to murder the captured prisoners. Władysław Franciszek Jabłonowski, who was half-black, was one of the Polish generals but died soon after reaching Saint-Domingue. Polish soldiers are credited with contributing to the establishment of the world's first free black republic and the first independent Caribbean state.

After Haiti gained its independence, Dessalines recognized the Poles and spared them when he ordered the massacre of most French whites and many free people of color (mulattos) on the island. He granted the Poles classification as Noir (black), who constituted the new ruling class, and in the constitution granted them full Haitian citizenship. Cazale became a center of their community. Descendants of Polish-Haitians were peasants like the great majority of most of the residents on the island. Cazale was sometimes called home of Zalewski, as many locals believed that was the source of the name. Zalewski is a common name, and the Haitian Creole word for home may also have been part of its history.

Haiti's first head of state Jean-Jacques Dessalines called Polish people "the White Negroes of Europe", which was then regarded a great honour, as it meant brotherhood between Poles and Haitians.
About 160 years later, in the mid-20th century, François Duvalier, the president of Haiti who was known for his black nationalist and Pan-African views, used the same concept of "European white Negroes" while referring to Polish people and glorifying their patriotism.

In 1983, Pope John Paul II visited Haiti. He mentioned how the Polish contributed to the slave rebellion leading to Haiti's independence. Jean-Claude Duvalier, the son of Papa Doc and his successor, ordered Polish Haitians to be selected to attend the various ceremonies planned for the Pope's visit and to wear "traditional clothes". Most wore their Sunday best.

One of the most revered Polish religious symbols is the icon named the Black Madonna of Częstochowa. It is thought to have been absorbed by Haitian Voodoo as Erzulie, or Ezili Dantor. This image of a black Virgin Mary holding the dark-skinned Infant Jesus influenced the vision of one of the Haitian Loa spirits. It is thought that Polish soldiers may have carried her image to Saint-Domingue.

To this day, Polish Haitians are mixed race and often identified by such European features as blonde or lighter and straighter hair, light eyes, and facial features. Of course, there were other Europeans on the island, including some who arrived after the war. Initially most Poles settled in Cazale, La Vallée-de-Jacmel, Fond-des-Blancs, La Baleine, Port-Salut and Saint-Jean-du-Sud, where they lived as peasants, along with their Haitian wives and families.

See also
 Polish Legions (Napoleonic period)

References

Sources

Ethnic groups in Haiti
European Haitian
Polish diaspora
Polish diaspora in North America
Haitian Revolution
History of Haiti
Slave rebellions in North America
Haiti–Poland relations